Yamané may refer to:
Yamané, Balé, Burkina Faso
Yamané, Bam, Burkina Faso